The following is a list of notable events and releases of the year 1918 in Norwegian music.

Events

Deaths

 November
 10 – Frants Beyer, average adjuster, tax inspector and composer (born 1851).

 December
 3 – Anders Heyerdahl, violinist, composer and folk music collector (born 1832).

Births

 July
 21 – Vidar Sandbeck, folk singer, composer, and writer (died 2005).

 September
 17 – Berit Brænne, actress, children's writer and songwriter (died 1976).

 November
 16 – Finn Ludt, pianist, composer and music critic (died 1992).
 24 – Torstein Grythe, choir leader (died 2009).

See also
 1918 in Norway
 Music of Norway

References

 
Norwegian music
Norwegian
Music
1910s in Norwegian music